Vierlingsbeek is a railway station located in Vierlingsbeek, Netherlands. It is situated on the Nijmegen–Venlo railway. The train services are operated by Arriva. The station building was demolished in 2004.

Train services
The following local train services call at this station:
Stoptrein: Nijmegen–Venlo–Roermond
Stoptrein: Nijmegen–Venray

External links
NS website 
Dutch public transport travel planner 

Railway stations in North Brabant
Buildings and structures in Land van Cuijk
Transport in Land van Cuijk